Jacob of Juterbogk (c. 1381 – 30 April 1465) was a German monk and theologian. Benedict Stolzenhagen, known in religion as Jacob, was born at Jüterbog in Brandenburg of poor peasant stock. He became a Cistercian at the monastery of Paradiz in Poland, and was sent by the abbot to the University of Kraków, where he became master in philosophy and doctor of theology. He returned to his monastery, of which he became abbot. In 1441, however, discontented with the absence of strict discipline of Salvatorberg near Erfurt, of which he became prior. He lectured on theology at the University of Erfurt, of which he was rector in 1456, and wrote around eighty treatises.  Like many men of his time, he promoted Conciliarism, the idea that a general council should be above the pope.

References

Literature
Meier, Ludger: Die Werke des Erfurter Kartäusers Jakob von Jüterbog in ihrer handschriftlichen Überlieferung, (=Beiträge zur Geschichte der Philosophie und Theologie des Mittelalters, 37/5), Verlag Aschendorff, Münster 1955

1381 births
1465 deaths
Carthusians
German Cistercians
German abbots
Jagiellonian University alumni